Mrugaraju is a 2001 Indian Telugu-language action adventure film directed by Gunasekhar. It stars Chiranjeevi, while Simran, Sanghavi and Nagendra Babu played the supporting roles. Mani Sharma composed the music. The film was released along with Devi Putrudu and Narasimha Naidu during Sankranthi festival. The core plot of the movie was reportedly based on the 1996 American film The Ghost and the Darkness. The film was dubbed into Tamil language as Vettaikaran and in Hindi as Rakshak - The Protector.

Plot 
In a jungle, there is a construction project going for making a railway's bridge. In the downwards Maa Durga statue was found, they put away the statue and many workers say that it's wrong and Maa Durga would punish them. On that night a lion attacks the chief engineer. The workers believe that it was the curse from Durga Maa. The railway department asks Aishwarya to go on the mission of constructing the bridge. Even after Aishwarya resumes the building, the lion starts terrorizing the crew of the construction team. Raju, the ace hunter of Adavipalli, is entrusted with the job of hunting the lion.

The first half is all about how Raju traps the lion and kills it at the cost of Appanna Dora. But the other lion in the jungle becomes enraged at Raju for killing its companion. There is another trouble for the bridge project in the form of a forest ranger and a local smuggler. Raju gets rid of these two goons by the interval.

Later it's revealed that Aishwarya is Raju's wife. In flashback, Raju comes to city to participate in the crafts fair to sell the herbs from the jungle. There, he meets Aishwarya, who came to visit a fun stall along with her fiancé Vicky. When Aishwarya tries to take a shot at shooting a balloon, Vicky disappoints her saying that she cannot do it. Raju, who is an onlooker, comes forward and gives her confidence and tips to shoot. Then Aishwarya's bullet hits the bull's eye. Impressed with Raju's help, she invites him to come to her engagement party.

At the party, Raju spots Vicky flirting with another girl and tells him about the importance of being a good human being.  Aishwarya watches the entire episode from behind, and she decides that Raju is a loyal man compared to the flirtatious Vicky. She seeks Raju's hand and they get married. Aishwarya's father cunningly separates the couple by creating misunderstandings. After this scene Aishwarya gets a letter from childcare office that her daughter feeling very upset without her. After the misunderstanding of between the couple, Aishwarya realises that she is pregnant. After few days her daughter was coming to see her. When Raju knows that he has a daughter he was overjoyed. When she came Aishwarya doesn't let her to go close to her father. When Raju's parents heard that their granddaughter came they were overwhelmed but Aishwarya doesn't permit them to touch her daughter. That night the man-eating lion again comes and hunts Raju's daughter, however, Raju's parents save their granddaughter. Before dying they tell their daughter-in-law about how her dad cheated them for his reputation.

Next morning all the workers leave their jobs and return to their home. Later, Raju's daughter is lost in the forest and the couple starts searching for her and  found her standing in front of the man-eating lion, Raju saves his daughter and finally kills the lion.

Cast 

 Chiranjeevi as Raju bhai
 Simran as Aishwarya 
 Sanghavi as Sivangi 
 Nagendra Babu as Appanna Dora 
 Brahmanandam as Ibraheem
 Prakash Raj as Valmiki Dora
 Surya as Forest Ranger
 Rami Reddy as Smuggler
 Raja Ravindra as Vicky
 Chalapathi Rao
 Gundu Hanumantha Rao
 L. B. Sriram
 Kovai Sarala
 Vijayakumar
 M. S. Narayana
 Kallu Chidambaram
 Niharika
 Rambha in Guest role in the song "Ramaiah Padaletti"

Soundtrack 

The soundtrack of the film was composed by Mani Sharma. The album consists of six songs. Lyrics for the three songs were penned by Veturi and the remaining three songs were written by Chandrabose, Kulasekhara and Bhuvanachandra.

Critical reception
Full Hyderabad wrote "Save for the phenomenal photography, there is nothing new about the film. Except for the part of Chiranjeevi trying to tame the lions, which has been photographed wonderfully, the story is quite contrived. What keeps the film afloat is the adventure drama, but unfortunately the director decides to sink his ship with a flashback that doesn't seem to end, contributing to tears and heartache." Idlebrain wrote "As story is plain and simple, a lot would depend upon screenplay to make the film gripping and interesting. But Guna Sekhar failed stitch the scenes in perfect manner. And he tried to ape the original film in most of the scenes, which resulted in poor copying as we lack the special FX finesse the Hollywood boast of".

References

External links 
 

2000s Telugu-language films
2001 films
Films directed by Gunasekhar
Films scored by Mani Sharma
Indian action films
Films about lions
Films about hunters
2001 action films